WBGT-CD (channel 46) is a low-power, Class A television station in Rochester, New York, United States, affiliated with MyNetworkTV. Owned by Vision Communications, the station has studios on Buffalo Road (NY 33) in the town of Gates (with a Rochester postal address), and its transmitter is located on Pinnacle Hill. It can also be seen on Charter Spectrum channel 18 (hence the My 18 branding).

WBGT-CD was formerly also seen over-the-air on analog repeater W26BZ (channel 26) in Victor, which is no longer licensed. This broadcast from a transmitter south of Perinton's Egypt hamlet along the Monroe and Ontario County line. This translator was replaced with another, WGCE-CD, some time before 2018; WGCE was spun off to HC2 Holdings in August 2018.

History

WBGT-CD began operations as WBGT-LP on February 2, 1998. For its first ten months on-air, it was an independent station under the Big TV branding, before it became an UPN affiliate in November of that year. Despite the affiliation, the station used the branding throughout the later years of the network.  The Victor translator was added in 1999, and in 2001, Time Warner Cable (predecessor of Charter Spectrum) added WBGT-LP to its lineup. On January 24, 2006, The WB and UPN announced that the networks would end broadcasting and merge to form The CW, which signed with cable-only WB affiliate WRWB (the forerunner of WHAM-DT2). Several weeks later, MyNetworkTV was announced by Fox as an alternative for UPN or WB affiliates not chosen by the CW. WBGT-LP quickly signed an affiliation deal with MyNetworkTV, and joined the network at its launch on September 5, 2006. Around this time, the suffix was changed from -LP to -CA.

The station has never been added to DirecTV; the station has no must-carry rights as a low-power operation. Eventually, when it signed on its digital facilities, the station's calls were changed to WBGT-CD.

Technical information

Subchannels
The station's digital signal is multiplexed:

See also
Channel 18 branded TV stations in the United States
Channel 29 digital TV stations in the United States
Channel 46 low-power TV stations in the United States
Channel 46 virtual TV stations in the United States

References

External links
WBGT-CD "My 18"

Television channels and stations established in 1998
BGT-CD
Low-power television stations in the United States
MyNetworkTV affiliates
Dabl affiliates
Decades (TV network) affiliates
Movies! affiliates
TheGrio affiliates
1998 establishments in New York (state)